The Outlaw Star anime is the adaptation of the manga series of the same name by Takehiko Ito. The plot follows the protagonist Gene and his crew in their outer space adventures on board their advanced spacecraft named the Outlaw Star.

The anime, which was produced by Sunrise and directed by Mitsuru Hongo, aired on Japan's TV Tokyo from January 8, 1998 to June 25, 1998 for a total of 26 episodes. The anime was later licensed for English language distribution in North America by Bandai Entertainment. The series originally aired on Toonami from January 15, 2001 to February 16, 2001. Episode 23 was not aired during this run due to scenes of extensive female nudity and sexually suggestive humor/themes; it was finally broadcast 17 years later, on February 25, 2018, during the revived Toonami block on Adult Swim.

Bandai released the series on DVD in Japan in two halves with the first 13 episodes released on August 25, 1999 and the remaining 13 episodes released on November 25, 1999. A Japanese "remastered" DVD boxset containing the entire series was published by Bandai on September 22, 2006. Bandai also released the series in North America in three DVD collections on September 1, 2000, February 14, 2001, and March 6, 2001. The Outlaw Star Perfect Collection Box Set, a DVD compilation of the entire series, was released on September 10, 2002. The series was again re-released on March 28, 2006 as the Outlaw Star: Complete Collection. Outlaw Star additionally received a Region 4 DVD release in Australia by Madman Entertainment on June 23, 2004.

The music for Outlaw Star was composed by Kow Otani. The series has three pieces of vocal music, one opening and two endings. The opening theme is "Through the Night" performed by Masahiko Arimachi. The two endings themes are "Hiru no Tsuki", used in the first 13 episodes, and "Tsuki no Ie", used in the remaining 13 episodes. Both endings are sung by Arai Akino.

Episodes

References

Episodes
Outlaw Star